The Prince Rupert station is on the Canadian National Railway mainline in Prince Rupert, British Columbia. The station is the western terminus for the Via Rail's Jasper–Prince Rupert train.

The station building was designed by the CNR Architectural Division in Winnipeg and constructed between 1921 and 1922 in a Modern Classical style adjacent to the waterfront. It became a federally designated Heritage Railway Station in 1992.
Services include car rental, telephones, vending machines and washrooms.

References

External links 
 Via Rail Station Description
 

Via Rail stations in British Columbia
Designated Heritage Railway Stations in British Columbia
Transport in Prince Rupert, British Columbia
Railway stations in Canada opened in 1922
1922 establishments in British Columbia